Maya was a 2018 Indian Tamil-language drama that ran from 9 July 2018 to 20 October 2018 in Sun TV. The show starred Ajay, Ayesha and Nakshatra Srinivas. The series was directed by Nanda Kumar and produced by director Sundar C. and his wife, actress Kushboo were the producers

Cast

Main
 Ajay as Raja Vikraman and Aravind
 King of Suryakundala Dynasty [a powerful monarch and warrior capable of killing many enemies single-handedly.
 Shwetha Hegde / Ayesha (after face transplant) as Rani Lakshmi Prabhavati and Darshini 
 Queen of Satavagheeni Dynasty and responsible in destroying Kalanthakan's body. Main heroine and Aravind's first wife (love marriage and a secret affair prior to Aravind's official marriage with Yaksha)
 Akansha Gandhi / Nakshatra Srinivas (after face transplant) as Icchapurani Chakravarthini Rani Simharathna and Yakshini (Yaksha) 
 Queen of Icchapuri  Dynasty and daughter of Mandagini, (Female antagonist - A powerful Warrior Queen who brought 27 kingdoms under her dominion and earned the title of Chakravarthini. Aravind's second wife (Brahma Thirumanam / married as per tradition)(main antagonist )
Unknown as ichapuri rajaguru kalanthakan:a royal priest of ichapuri dynasty the real maya who will soon return to the world to fulfil and ancient phrophechy as a part of a boon that god had gifted him after his terrible defeat 2000 years ago in the hands of the devas(antagonist).

Supporting
Sadiq as Ameer Baasha or Vaapa or Satavagheeni Padai Thalapathi Sultan Bhai (before 2000 years ago).
An Ayurvedic and Mystical art specialist who supports Darshini like her father for taking care and protecting her. 2000 years ago, he was a Supreme Commander of Satavagheeni Army. He is also a devotee of Allah.
 Vincent Asokan as Icchapuri Padai Thalapathi Rana Maayan and Aardhanaari
 Supreme Commander of Icchapuri Army and responsible in betraying Kalanthakan. A devotee and son of Dhumavathi Devi, a Demi goddess.(antagonist)
 --- as Jyothiingam.
Former Chief Commander of Satavagheeni Army. Banished from Satavagheeni kingdom and cursed by Queen Lakshmi Prabhavathi due to his betrayal to her and her kingdom. A devotee of Lord Shiva and Bhavani Amman.
 --- as Shiva Acharya.
 A devotee of Lord Shiva and helps Darshini with Home Minister for the sake of world.  
 --- as Sugumadhapura and Kuyli (Tamil) or Swethasudha and Gayathri (Telugu).
 A magical shape-shifting pigeon and apprentice of Jyothiingam. She helps Darshini with a following instructions given by Jyothiingam.  
 Manobala as Bhadra 
Rana Maayan's apprentice.
 'Aranmanai Kili' Gayathri as Manthagini.
 Yaksha's Mother.
Yashika Aannand as Devathai Raagini
 A spirit that protects Aravind and Darshini from the danger of Ranamaayan's power.
 Kulappulli Leela as Alangariamma 
 Kalanthakan's mother knows black magic and is a devotee of Dandhini Devi an evil Demi goddess. 
 Singamuthu as Constable.
 Bhadra's friend. 
 Ammu Ramachandran as Lavanya.
 sister-in-law of Yaksha.
 Shyam as Subhash.
 Yaksha's brother.
 Anitha Venkat as Girija.
 Yaksha's aunt.
 Sonia as Varshinipriya
 Girija's first daughter.
 Ameya Nair as Sandhiya 
 Girija's second daughter.
 Srinidhi Bhat as Nirmal.
 Yaksha's ex-husband.
 --- as Jagan.
 Nirmal's father.
 Mohan Sharma as Minister Thangapaandi.
 Mahanadi Shankar as Pasupathi (Saalappaa)
 Alangariamma's loyal assistant.
 Divya Krishnan

Dubbed versions

References

External links 
 Official Website 
 Sun TV on YouTube
 Sun TV Network 
 Sun Group 

2010s Tamil-language television series
2018 Tamil-language television series debuts
2018 Tamil-language television series endings
Sun TV original programming
Tamil-language fantasy television series
Tamil-language horror fiction television series
Tamil-language television shows
Television shows set in Malaysia